Ksenia Andreyevna Novikova (born May 17, 1980, Moscow) is a Russian singer, actress, and songwriter. She is the soloist of the female pop group Blestyashchiye.

Biography
Ksenia Andreyevna Novikova was born in Moscow. At the age of five she became a soloist of the Loktev's Choir.

Musical career 
In August 1999, Ksenia was invited to the group Blestyashchiye in place of the departed Polina Iodis. Before the official participation in the group Ksenia was her back-vocalist. During the entire period of Ksenia's participation, the group recorded four studio albums and one compilation. Composition Olga Orlova, Zhanna Friske, Ksenia Novikova and Irina Lukyanova is still considered the golden composition of the group. In 2006 she appeared on the covers of the magazines Maxim and XXL.

In the middle of 2007 Ksenia left Blestyashchiye, in which she stayed the longest soloist (eight years). In June 2011, four years after leaving, Novikova returned to the group. Since 2012, Ksenia is engaged in solo work. Since 2014 she has been teaching at Moscow University for the Humanities. In May 2018, she returned to the group for the third time.

References

External links
 Official site
 

1980 births
Living people
Singers from Moscow
20th-century Russian singers
21st-century Russian singers
Russian pop singers
Russian record producers
Russian child singers
20th-century Russian women singers
21st-century Russian women singers
Women record producers